Cunt is a vulgar word for the vulva or vagina.  It is used in a variety of ways, including as a term of disparagement. Reflecting national variations, cunt can be used as a disparaging and obscene term for a woman in the United States, an unpleasant or stupid man or woman in the United Kingdom, or a contemptible man in Australia and New Zealand. However, in Australia and New Zealand it can also be a neutral or positive term when used with a positive qualifier (e.g., "He's a good cunt"). The term has various derivative senses, including adjective and verb uses.

Feminist writer and English professor Germaine Greer argues that cunt "is one of the few remaining words in the English language with a genuine power to shock".

History 
The earliest known use of the word, according to the Oxford English Dictionary, was as part of a placename of a London street, Gropecunt Lane, . Use of the word as a term of abuse is relatively recent, dating from the late nineteenth century. The word appears not to have been taboo in the Middle Ages, but became taboo towards the end of the eighteenth century, and was then not generally admissible in print until the latter part of the twentieth century.

Etymology

Scholars are uncertain of the origin of the Proto-Germanic form itself.

The etymology of the Proto-Germanic term is disputed. It may have arisen by Grimm's law operating on the Proto-Indo-European root  "" seen in gonads, genital, gamete, genetics, gene, or the Proto-Indo-European root  "" (seen in gynaecology). Relationships to similar-sounding words such as the Latin  (""), and its derivatives French , Spanish , and Portuguese , or in Persian , have not been conclusively demonstrated.

The word, in its modern meaning, is attested in Middle English. Proverbs of Hendyng, a manuscript from some time before 1325, includes the advice:

Offensiveness

Generally
The word cunt is generally regarded in English-speaking countries as profanity and unsuitable for normal public discourse. It has been described as "the most heavily tabooed word of all English words", although John Ayto, editor of the Oxford Dictionary of Slang, says "nigger" is more taboo.

Feminist perspectives

Some American feminists of the 1970s sought to eliminate disparaging terms for women, including "bitch" and "cunt". In the context of pornography, Catharine MacKinnon argued that use of the word acts to reinforce a dehumanisation of women by reducing them to mere body parts; and in 1979 Andrea Dworkin described the word as reducing women to "the one essential – 'cunt: our essence ... our offence'".

Despite criticisms, there is a movement among feminists that seeks to reclaim cunt not only as acceptable, but as an honorific, in much the same way that queer has been reappropriated by LGBT people and nigger has been by some African-Americans. Proponents include artist Tee Corinne in The Cunt Coloring Book (1975); Eve Ensler in "Reclaiming Cunt" from The Vagina Monologues (1996); and  Inga Muscio in her book, Cunt: A Declaration of Independence (1998);.

Germaine Greer, the feminist writer and professor of English who once published a magazine article entitled "Lady, Love Your Cunt" (anthologised in 1986), discussed the origins, usage and power of the word in the BBC series Balderdash and Piffle, explaining how her views had developed over time. In the 1970s she had "championed" the use of the word for the female genitalia, thinking it "shouldn't be abusive"; she rejected the "proper" word vagina, a Latin name meaning "sword-sheath" originally applied by male anatomists to all muscle coverings (see synovial sheath) – not just because it refers only to the internal canal but also because of the implication that the female body is "simply a receptacle for a weapon". But in 2006, referring to its use as a term of abuse, she said that, though used in some quarters as a term of affection, it had become "the most offensive insult one man could throw at another" and suggested that the word was "sacred", and "a word of immense power, to be used sparingly".

Usage: pre-twentieth century
Cunt has been attested in its anatomical meaning since at least the 13th century. While Francis Grose's 1785 A Classical Dictionary of The Vulgar Tongue listed the word as "C**T: a nasty name for a nasty thing", it did not appear in any major English dictionary from 1795 to 1961, when it was included in Webster's Third New International Dictionary with the comment "usu. considered obscene". Its first appearance in the Oxford English Dictionary was in 1972, which cites the word as having been in use from 1230 in what was supposedly a London street name of "Gropecunte Lane". It was, however, also used before 1230, having been brought over by the Anglo-Saxons, originally not an obscenity but rather an ordinary name for the vulva or vagina. Gropecunt Lane was originally a street of prostitution, a red light district. It was normal in the Middle Ages for streets to be named after the goods available for sale therein, hence the prevalence in cities having a medieval history of names such as "Silver Street" and "Fish Street". In some locations, the former name has been bowdlerised, as in the City of York, to the more acceptable "Grape Lane".

The somewhat similar word 'queynte' appears several times in Chaucer's Canterbury Tales (c. 1390), in bawdy contexts, but since it is used openly, does not appear to have been considered obscene at that time. A notable use is from the "Miller's Tale": "Pryvely he caught her by the queynte." The Wife of Bath also uses this term, "For certeyn, olde dotard, by your leave/You shall have queynte right enough at eve .... What aileth you to grouche thus and groan?/Is it for ye would have my queynte alone?" In modernised versions of these passages the word "queynte" is usually translated simply as "cunt". However, in Chaucer's usage there seems to be an overlap between the words "cunt" and "quaint" (possibly derived from the Latin for "known"). "Quaint" was probably pronounced in Middle English in much the same way as "cunt". It is sometimes unclear whether the two words were thought of as distinct from one another. Elsewhere in Chaucer's work the word queynte seems to be used with meaning comparable to the modern "quaint" (curious or old-fashioned, but nevertheless appealing). This ambiguity was still being exploited by the 17th century; Andrew Marvell's ... then worms shall try / That long preserved virginity, / And your quaint honour turn to dust, / And into ashes all my lust in To His Coy Mistress depends on a pun on these two senses of "quaint".

By Shakespeare's day, the word seems to have become obscene. Although Shakespeare does not use the word explicitly (or with derogatory meaning) in his plays, he still uses wordplay to sneak it in obliquely. In Act III, Scene 2, of Hamlet, as the castle's residents are settling in to watch the play-within-the-play, Hamlet asks his girlfriend Ophelia, "Lady, shall I lie in your lap?" Ophelia replies, "No, my lord." Hamlet, feigning shock, says, "Do you think I meant country matters?" Then, to drive home the point that the accent is definitely on the first syllable of country, Shakespeare has Hamlet say, "That's a fair thought, to lie between maids' legs." In Twelfth Night (Act II, Scene V) the puritanical Malvolio believes he recognises his employer's handwriting in an anonymous letter, commenting "There be her very Cs, her Us, and her Ts: and thus makes she her great Ps", unwittingly punning on "cunt" and "piss", and while it has also been argued that the slang term "cut" is intended, Pauline Kiernan writes that Shakespeare ridicules "prissy puritanical party-poopers" by having "a Puritan spell out the word 'cunt' on a public stage". A related scene occurs in Henry V: when Katherine is learning English, she is appalled at the "gros, et impudique" words "foot" and "gown", which her teacher has mispronounced as "coun". It is usually argued that Shakespeare intends to suggest that she has misheard "foot" as "foutre" (French, "fuck") and "coun" as "con" (French "cunt", also used to mean "idiot").

Similarly John Donne alludes to the obscene meaning of the word without being explicit in his poem The Good-Morrow, referring to sucking on "country pleasures". The 1675 Restoration comedy The Country Wife also features such word play, even in its title.

By the 17th century, a softer form of the word, "cunny", came into use. A well-known use of this derivation can be found in the 25 October 1668 entry of the diary of Samuel Pepys. He was discovered having an affair with Deborah Willet: he wrote that his wife "coming up suddenly, did find me embracing the girl con [with] my hand sub [under] su [her] coats; and endeed I was with my main [hand] in her cunny. I was at a wonderful loss upon it and the girl also ...."

Cunny was probably derived from a pun on coney, meaning "rabbit", rather as pussy is connected to the same term for a cat. (Philip Massinger (1583–1640): "A pox upon your Christian cockatrices! Eventually, the taboo association led to the word "coney" becoming deprecated entirely and replaced by the word "rabbit".

Robert Burns (1759–1796) used the word in his Merry Muses of Caledonia, a collection of bawdy verses which he kept to himself and were not publicly available until the mid-1960s. In "Yon, Yon, Yon, Lassie", this couplet appears: "For ilka birss upon her cunt, Was worth a ryal ransom" ("For every hair upon her cunt was worth a royal ransom").

Usage: modern

As a term of abuse

Merriam-Webster states it is a "usually disparaging and obscene" term for a woman, and that it is an "offensive way to refer to a woman" in the United States. In American slang, the term can also be used to refer to "a fellow male homosexual one dislikes". Australian scholar Emma Alice Jane describes how the term as used on modern social media is an example of what she calls "gendered vitriol", and an example of misogynistic e-bile. As a broader derogatory term, it is comparable to prick and means "a fool, a dolt, an unpleasant person – of either sex". This sense is common in New Zealand, British, and Australian English, where it is usually applied to men or as referring specifically to "a despicable, contemptible or foolish" man.

During the 1971 Oz trial for obscenity, prosecuting counsel asked writer George Melly, "Would you call your 10-year-old daughter a cunt?" Melly replied, "No, because I don't think she is."

In the 1975 film One Flew Over the Cuckoo's Nest, the central character McMurphy, when pressed to explain exactly why he does not like the tyrannical Nurse Ratched, says, "Well, I don't want to break up the meeting or nothing, but she's something of a cunt, ain't she, Doc?"

Other usage
In informal British, Irish, New Zealand, and Australian English, and occasionally but to a lesser extent in Canadian English, it can be used with no negative connotations to refer to a (usually male) person. In this sense, it may be modified by a positive qualifier (funny, clever, etc.). For example, "This is my mate Brian. He's a good cunt."

It can also be used to refer to something very difficult or unpleasant (as in "a cunt of a job").

In the Survey of English Dialects the word was recorded in some areas as meaning "the vulva of a cow". This was pronounced as [kʌnt] in Devon, and [kʊnt] in the Isle of Man, Gloucestershire and Northumberland. Possibly related was the word cunny [kʌni], with the same meaning, in Wiltshire.

The word "cunty" is also known, although used rarely: a line from Hanif Kureishi's My Beautiful Laundrette is the definition of England by a Pakistani immigrant as "eating hot buttered toast with cunty fingers", suggestive of hypocrisy and a hidden sordidness or immorality behind the country's quaint façade. This term is attributed to British novelist Henry Green. In the United States, "cunty" is sometimes used in cross-dressing drag ball culture for a drag queen that "projects feminine beauty" and was the title of a hit song by Aviance. A visitor to a New York drag show tells of the emcee praising a queen with "cunty, cunty, cunty" as she walks past.

Frequency of use
Frequency of use varies widely. According to research in 2013 and 2014 by Aston University and the University of South Carolina, based on a corpus of nearly 9 billion words in geotagged tweets, the word was most frequently used in the United States in New England and was least frequently used in the south-eastern states. In Maine, it was the most frequently used "cuss word" after "asshole".

Examples of use

Literature

James Joyce was one of the first major 20th-century novelists to put the word "cunt" into print. In the context of one of the central characters in Ulysses (1922), Leopold Bloom, Joyce refers to the Dead Sea and to 
Joyce uses the word figuratively rather than literally; but while Joyce used the word only once in Ulysses, with four other wordplays ('cunty') on it, D. H. Lawrence used the word ten times in Lady Chatterley's Lover (1928), in a more direct sense. Mellors, the gamekeeper and eponymous lover, tries delicately to explain the definition of the word to Lady Constance Chatterley: "If your sister there comes ter me for a bit o' cunt an' tenderness, she knows what she's after." The novel was the subject of an unsuccessful UK prosecution in 1961 against its publishers, Penguin Books, on grounds of obscenity.

Samuel Beckett was an associate of Joyce, and in his Malone Dies (1956), he writes: "His young wife had abandoned all hope of bringing him to heel, by means of her cunt, that trump card of young wives." In 1998, Inga Muscio published Cunt: A Declaration of Independence. In Ian McEwan's novel Atonement (2001), set in 1935, the word is used in the draft of a love letter mistakenly sent instead of a revised version and, although not spoken, is an important plot pivot.

Irvine Welsh uses the word widely in his novels, such as Trainspotting, generally as a generic placeholder for a man, and not always negatively, e.g. "Ah wis the cunt wi the fuckin pool cue in ma hand, n the plukey cunt could huv the fat end ay it in his pus if he wanted, like."

Art

The word is occasionally used in the titles of works of art, such as Peter Renosa's portrait of the pop singer Madonna, "I am the Cunt of Western Civilization", a 1990 quote from the singer. One of the first works of Gilbert & George was a self-portrait in 1969 entitled "Gilbert the Shit and George the Cunt". The London performance art group the Neo Naturists had a song and an act called "Cunt Power", a name which potter Grayson Perry borrowed for one of his early works: "An unglazed piece of modest dimensions, made from terracotta like clay – labia carefully formed with once wet material, about its midriff".  Australian artist Greg Taylor's display of scores of white porcelain vulvas, "CUNTS and other conversations" (2009), was deemed controversial for both its title and content, with Australia Post warning the artist that the publicity postcards were illegal.

Theatre
Theatre censorship was effectively abolished in the UK in 1968; prior to that, all theatrical productions had to be vetted by the Lord Chamberlain's Office. English stand-up comedian Roy "Chubby" Brown claims that he was the first person to say the word on stage in the United Kingdom.

Television

United Kingdom
Broadcast media are regulated for content, and media providers such as the BBC have guidelines as to how "cunt" and similar words should be treated. In a survey of 2000 commissioned by the British Broadcasting Standards Commission, Independent Television Commission, BBC and Advertising Standards Authority, "cunt" was regarded as the most offensive word which could be heard, above "motherfucker" and "fuck". Nevertheless, there have been occasions when, particularly in a live broadcast, the word has been aired outside editorial control:
 The Frost Programme, broadcast 7 November 1970, was the first time the word was known to have been used on British television, in an aside by Felix Dennis. This incident has since been reshown many times.
 Bernard Manning first said on television the line "They say you are what you eat. I'm a cunt."
 This Morning broadcast the word in 2000, used by model Caprice Bourret while being interviewed live about her role in The Vagina Monologues.

The first scripted uses of the word on British television occurred in 1979, in the ITV drama No Mama No. In Jerry Springer – The Opera (BBC, 2005), the suggestion that the Christ character might be gay was found more controversial than the chant describing the Devil as "cunting, cunting, cunting, cunting cunt".

In July 2007 BBC Three broadcast an hour-long documentary, entitled The 'C' Word, about the origins, use and evolution of the word from the early 1900s to the present day. Presented by British comedian Will Smith, viewers were taken to a street in Oxford once called "Gropecunt Lane" and presented with examples of the acceptability of "cunt" as a word. (Note that "the C-word" is also a long-standing euphemism for cancer; Lisa Lynch's book led to a BBC1 drama, both with that title.)

The Attitudes to potentially offensive language and gestures on TV and radio report by Ofcom, based on research conducted by Ipsos MORI, categorised the usage of the word 'cunt' as a highly unacceptable pre-watershed, but generally acceptable post-watershed, along with 'fuck' and 'motherfucker'. Discriminatory words were generally considered as more offensive than the most offensive non-discriminatory words such as 'cunt' by the UK public, with discriminatory words being more regulated as a result.

United States
The first scripted use on US television was on the Larry Sanders Show in 1992, and a notable use occurred in Sex and the City. In the US, an episode of the NBC TV show 30 Rock, titled "The C Word", centered around a subordinate calling protagonist Liz Lemon (Tina Fey) a "cunt" and her subsequent efforts to regain her staff's favour. Characters in the popular TV series The Sopranos often used the term. Jane Fonda uttered the word on a live airing of the Today Show, a network broadcast-TV news program, in 2008 when being interviewed about The Vagina Monologues. In 2018, Canadian comedian Samantha Bee had to apologise after calling Ivanka Trump, a White House official and the daughter of US President Donald Trump, a "feckless cunt".

Radio
On 6 December 2010 on the BBC Radio 4 Today programme, presenter James Naughtie referred to the British Culture Secretary Jeremy Hunt as "Jeremy Cunt"; he later apologized for what the BBC called the inadvertent use of "an offensive four-letter word". In the programme following, about an hour later, Andrew Marr referred to the incident during Start the Week where it was said that "we won't repeat the mistake" whereupon Marr slipped up in the same way as Naughtie had.

Film

In the United States, the word's first appearance was in graffiti on a wall in the 1969 film Bronco Bullfrog. The first spoken use of the word in mainstream cinema occurs in Carnal Knowledge (1971), in which Jonathan (Jack Nicholson) asks, "Is this an ultimatum? Answer me, you ball-busting, castrating, son of a cunt bitch! Is this an ultimatum or not?" In the same year, the word was used in the film Women in Revolt, in which Holly Woodlawn shouts "I love cunt" whilst avoiding a violent boyfriend. Nicholson later used it again, in One Flew Over the Cuckoo's Nest (1975). Two early films by Martin Scorsese, Mean Streets (1973) and Taxi Driver (1976), use the word in the context of the virgin-whore dichotomy, with characters using it after they were rejected (in Mean Streets) or after they have slept with the woman (in Taxi Driver).

In notable instances, the word has been edited out. Saturday Night Fever (1977) was released in two versions, "R" (Restricted) and "PG" (Parental Guidance), the latter omitting or replacing dialogue such as Tony Manero (John Travolta)'s comment to Annette (Donna Pescow), "It's a decision a girl's gotta make early in life, if she's gonna be a nice girl or a cunt". This differential persists, and in The Silence of the Lambs (1991), Agent Starling (Jodie Foster) meets Dr. Hannibal Lecter (Anthony Hopkins) for the first time and passes the cell of "Multiple Miggs", who says to Starling: "I can smell your cunt." In versions of the film edited for television the word is dubbed with the word scent. The 2010 film Kick-Ass caused a controversy when the word was used by Hit-Girl because the actress playing the part, Chloë Grace Moretz, was 11 years old at the time of filming.

In Britain, use of the word "cunt" may result in an "18" rating from the British Board of Film Classification (BBFC), and this happened to Ken Loach's film Sweet Sixteen, because of an estimated twenty uses of "cunt". Still, the BBFC's guidelines at "15" state that "very strong language may be permitted, depending on the manner in which it is used, who is using the language, its frequency within the work as a whole and any special contextual justification". Also directed by Loach, My Name is Joe was given a 15 certificate despite more than one instance of the word. The 2010 Ian Dury biopic Sex & Drugs & Rock & Roll was given a "15" rating despite containing seven uses of the word. The BBFC have also allowed it at the "12" level, in the case of well known works such as Hamlet.

Comedy
In their Derek and Clive dialogues, Peter Cook and Dudley Moore, particularly Cook, used the word in the 1976 sketch "This Bloke Came Up To Me", with "cunt" used 35 times. The word is also used extensively by British comedian Roy 'Chubby' Brown, which ensures that his stand-up act has never been fully shown on UK television.

Australian stand-up comedian Rodney Rude frequently refers to his audiences as "cunts" and makes frequent use of the word in his acts, which got him arrested in Queensland and Western Australia for breaching obscenity laws of those states in the mid-1980s. Australian comedic singer Kevin Bloody Wilson makes extensive use of the word, most notably in the songs Caring Understanding Nineties Type and You Can't Say "Cunt" in Canada.

The word appears in American comic George Carlin's 1972 standup routine on the list of the seven dirty words that could not, at that time, be said on American broadcast television, a routine that led to a U. S. Supreme Court decision. While some of the original seven are now heard on US broadcast television from time to time, "cunt" remains generally taboo except on premium paid subscription cable channels like HBO or Showtime. Comedian Louis C.K. uses the term frequently in his stage act as well as on his television show Louie on FX network, which bleeps it out.

In 2018, Canadian comedian Samantha Bee had to apologise after calling Ivanka Trump a cunt on American late night TV show Full Frontal with Samantha Bee.

Music
The 1977 Ian Dury and The Blockheads album, New Boots and Panties used the word in the opening line of the track "Plaistow Patricia", thus: "Arseholes, bastards, fucking cunts and pricks", particularly notable as there is no musical lead-in to the lyrics.

In 1979, during a concert at New York's Bottom Line, Carlene Carter introduced a song about mate-swapping called "Swap-Meat Rag" by stating, "If this song doesn't put the cunt back in country, nothing will." However use of the word in lyrics is not recorded before the Sid Vicious's 1978 version of "My Way", which marked the first known use of the word in a UK top 10 hit, as a line was changed to "You cunt/I'm not a queer". The following year, "cunt" was used more explicitly in the song "Why D'Ya Do It?" from Marianne Faithfull's album Broken English: 

The Happy Mondays song, "Kuff Dam" (i.e. "Mad fuck" in reverse), from their 1987 debut album, Squirrel and G-Man Twenty Four Hour Party People Plastic Face Carnt Smile (White Out), includes the lyrics "You see that Jesus is a cunt / And never helped you with a thing that you do, or you don't". Biblical scholar James Crossley, writing in the academic journal, Biblical Interpretation, analyses the Happy Mondays' reference to "Jesus is a cunt" as a description of the "useless assistance" of a now "inadequate Jesus". A phrase from the same lyric, "Jesus is a cunt" was included on the notorious Cradle of Filth T-shirt which depicted a masturbating nun on the front and the slogan "Jesus is a cunt" in large letters on the back. The T-shirt was banned in New Zealand, in 2008.

Liz Phair in "Dance of Seven Veils" on her 1993 album Exile in Guyville, uses the word in the line "I only ask because I'm a real cunt in spring".

The word has been used by numerous non-mainstream bands, such as the Australian band TISM, who released an extended play in 1993 Australia the Lucky Cunt (a reference to Australia's label the "lucky country"). They also released a single in 1998 entitled "I Might Be a Cunt, but I'm Not a Fucking Cunt", which was banned. The American grindcore band Anal Cunt, on being signed to a bigger label, shortened their name to AxCx.

"Cunt" is uncommon for rap, but there are some examples of its appearance:
 In Busta Rhymes's song "Light Your Ass on Fire" from the Neptunes album Clones, the word appears in a verse "I see your little gap between your cunt and yo ass."
 The word appears once in Nicki Minaj's 2010 song "Roman's Revenge". The song includes the lyric "I'm a bad bitch, I'm a cunt." She uses this word again in the song "Ganja Burn" from 2018 album Queen, in a verse: "Watch them cunts learn".
 The word appears 9 times in Azealia Banks' song "212", where in two verses she sings "Imma ruin you, cunt." She is also known to refer to her fans as "kunts". Banks has said she is "tired" of defending her profanity-laden lyrics from critics, saying they reflect her everyday speech and experiences.
 It also appears in Flo Milli song "Not Friendly", where she sings a verse "Stay in your place, you little bitty cunt."

Computer and video games
The 2004 video game Grand Theft Auto: San Andreas was the first major video game to use the word, along with being the first in the series to use the words nigga, motherfucker, and cocksucker. It was used just once, by the British character Kent Paul (voiced by Danny Dyer), who refers to Maccer as a "soppy cunt" in the mission Don Peyote.

The 2004 title The Getaway: Black Monday by SCEE used the word several times during the game.

In the 2008 title Grand Theft Auto IV (developed by Rockstar North and distributed by Take Two Interactive), the word, amongst many other expletives, was used by James Pegorino who, after finding out that his personal bodyguard had turned states, exclaimed "The world is a cunt!" while aiming a shotgun at the player.

Linguistic variants and derivatives
Various euphemisms, minced forms and in-jokes are used to imply the word without actually saying it, thereby escaping obvious censure and censorship.

Spoonerisms

Deriving from a dirty joke: "What's the difference between a circus and a strip club?"- "The circus has a bunch of cunning stunts...." The phrase cunning stunt has been used in popular music. Its first documented appearance was by the English band Caravan, who released the album Cunning Stunts in July 1975; the title was later used by Metallica for a CD/Video compilation, and in 1992 the Cows released an album with the same title. In his 1980s BBC television programme, Kenny Everett played a vapid starlet, Cupid Stunt.

Acronyms
There are numerous informal acronyms, including various apocryphal stories concerning academic establishments, such as the Cambridge University National Trust Society.

Puns
The name "Mike Hunt" is a frequent pun on my cunt; it has been used in a scene from the movie Porky's, and for a character in the BBC radio comedy Radio Active in the 1980s. "Has Anyone Seen Mike Hunt?" were the words written on a "pink neon sculpture" representing the letter C, in a 2004 exhibition of the alphabet at the British Library in collaboration with the International Society of Typographic Designers.

As well as obvious references, there are also allusions. On I'm Sorry I Haven't a Clue, Stephen Fry once defined countryside as the act of "murdering Piers Morgan".

The title of the BBC comedy game show Stupid Punts, which ran from 2001 to 2003, appears to have been a pun on "Stupid Cunts".

Even Parliaments are not immune from punning uses; as recalled by former Australian prime minister Gough Whitlam:
and Mark Lamarr used a variation of this same gag on BBC TV's Never Mind the Buzzcocks. "Stuart Adamson was a Big Country member... and we do remember".

Derived meanings
The word "cunt" forms part of some technical terms used in seafaring and other industries.
 In nautical usage, a cunt splice is a type of rope splice used to join two lines in the rigging of ships. Its name has been bowdlerised since at least 1861, and in more recent times it is commonly referred to as a "cut splice".
 The Dictionary of Sea Terms, found within Dana's 1841 maritime compendium The Seaman's Friend, defines the word cuntline as "the space between the bilges of two casks, stowed side by side. Where one cask is set upon the cuntline between two others, they are stowed bilge and cuntline." The "bilge" of a barrel or cask is the widest point, so when stored together the two casks would produce a curved V-shaped gap. The glossary of The Ashley Book of Knots by Clifford W. Ashley, first published in 1944, defines cuntlines as "the surface seams between the strands of a rope." Though referring to a different object from Dana's definition, it similarly describes the crease formed by two abutting cylinders.
 In US military usage personnel refer privately to a common uniform item, a flat, soft cover (hat) with a fold along the top resembling an invagination, as a cunt cap. The proper name for the item is garrison cap or overseas cap, depending on the organization in which it is worn.

 Cunt hair (sometimes as red cunt hair) has been used since the late 1950s to signify a very small distance.
 Cunt-eyed has been used to refer to a person with narrow, squinting eyes.

See also
 Scunthorpe problem
 Sexual slang

References

Further reading
 Lady Love Your Cunt, 1969 article by Germaine Greer (see References above)
 Vaginal Aesthetics, re-creating the representation, the richness and sweetness, of "vagina/cunt", an article by Joanna Frueh Source: Hypatia, Vol. 18, No. 4, Women, Art, and Aesthetics (Autumn–Winter 2003), pp. 137–158

External links
 

Pejorative terms for women
English profanity
Sexual slang
Vulva
Australian slang